Bolvir is a village in the province of Girona and autonomous community of Catalonia, Spain.

References

External links
 Government data pages 
 Water path of Bolvir

Municipalities in Cerdanya (comarca)
Municipalities in the Province of Girona